Miguel Moreno Arreola (1921–2005) was a Mexican military pilot. He was born in Durango, Mexico on January 5, 1921 and died in Mexico City on December 1, 2005 following a motor-vehicle accident. He distinguished himself during World War II, flying combat missions with the 201 Squadron based in the Philippines taking missions to Japan.

References

Mexican military personnel
Mexican military personnel of World War II
Mexican aviators
1921 births
2005 deaths
Commercial aviators